The 2001–02 season was the 45th season in RK Zamet’s history. It is their 1st successive season in the 1.HRL, and 25th successive top tier season.

First team squad

Goalkeeper
1  Ivan Stevanović
12   Petar Misovski
16  Igor Saršon

Wingers
RW
 3  Tadej Široka
 8  Boris Batinić

LW
 4  Mateo Hrvatin
 15  Janko Mavrović
 20  Marko Erstić 

Line players
2  Damir Bogdanović
6  Dalibor Zupčić
 11  Mirjan Horvat
 21  Kristijan Ljubanović

Back players
LB
5  Borna Franić (captain)
9  Tomislav Matošević
 10  Robert Savković

CB
11  Tomislav Mesarov
18  Branko Radović
19  Egon Paljar

RB
 5  Davor Šunjić
 7  Milan Uzelac (injured since October)
 7  Ivan Marenčić
 13  Mario Barić

Technical staff 
  President: Miljenko Mišljenović 
  Sports director: Damir Bogdanović
  Technical director: Boris Konjuh
  Marketing director: Boris Konjuh
  Club Secretary: Senka Glušević
  Head Coach: Damir Čavlović 
  Assistant Coach: Sergio DePrivitellio 
  Fizioterapist: Marinko Anić
  Tehniko: Marin Miculinić

Competitions

Overall

EHF Cup Winners' Cup

Matches

1. HRL

League table

Matches

Croatian Cup

Matches

Friendly matches

Mid-season

External links
HRS
Sport.net.hr
Rk-zamet.hr

References

RK Zamet seasons
Handball in Croatia